Camptown may refer to:

Places
 Camptown (country subdivision), a provincial capital in Lesotho
 Camptown, Pennsylvania, United States
 Camptown, Scottish Borders, Scotland
 Camptown, Virginia, United States

Other uses
 Camptown FC, a Guyanese football club that plays in the GFF National Super League
 Camptown Historic District, La Mott, Pennsylvania
 "Camptown Races", an 1850 minstrel song
 Kijichon (Camptown), military base camp towns serving US forces in South Korea